Robert McNeill (Neill) Alexander, CBE FRS (7 July 1934 – 21 March 2016) was a British zoologist and a leading authority in the field of biomechanics.  For thirty years he was Professor of Zoology at the University of Leeds.

Early life and education
Alexander was born in Lisburn, Northern Ireland, one of the four sons of Robert Alexander and his wife Janet McNeill. His father was chief engineer of the city of Belfast.  His mother was a novelist and playwright who wrote more than 20 children’s books and two opera libretti.  He was educated at Tonbridge School and at Trinity Hall, Cambridge where he gained an MA and a PhD. His PhD research at Cambridge was supervised by Professor Sir James Gray, FRS.  Subsequently he was awarded a DSc by the University of Wales.

Academic career
Alexander was a Lecturer at the University College of North Wales (now Bangor University) from 1958 to 1969 and then Professor of Zoology at the University of Leeds from 1969 until his retirement in 1999, when the title of emeritus professor was conferred upon him.

Until 1970, he was mainly concerned with fish, investigating the mechanics of swim bladders, tails and fish jaw mechanisms. Subsequently, he concentrated on the mechanics of terrestrial locomotion, notably walking and running in mammals, particularly on gait selection and its relationship to anatomy and to the structural design of skeletons and muscles.

Alexander was particularly interested in the mechanics of dinosaur locomotion. He developed a formula to calculate the speed of motion of dinosaurs, the so-called 'dinosaur speed calculator,' mathematically derived from the Froude number:

"The key to deriving estimates of dinosaur gait and speed from trackways was provided by the zoologist R. McNeill Alexander (1976). From observations of modern animals he derived a general relationship between an animal's speed of locomotion (v) and its hip height (h) and its stride length (SL), which is

Alexander also pointed out that this formula could be applied to dinosaur trackways since the stride length can be measured directly and the hip height could be estimated from the size of the foot print."

Originally, Alexander stated: "I have now obtained a relationship between speed, stride length and body size from observations of living animals and applied this to dinosaurs to achieve estimates of their speeds. The estimated speeds are rather low—between 1.0 and 3.6 ms−1."

Modifications to the original formula gave rise to revised estimates, and "Alexander (1996) argued that based on the bone dimensions of Tyrannosaurus it is unlikely they could have travelled at more than 8ms−1." Several calculations using variants of the formula indicate that dinosaurs probably travelled at around 3 ms−1 with a top speed of 8 ms−1. This translates to a speed range of roughly 6–20 mph.

Alexander was secretary of the Zoological Society of London (1992–1999) which included supervising the management of London and Whipsnade Zoos. He was president of the Society for Experimental Biology (1995–1997), President of the International Society of Vertebrate Morphologists (1997–2001) and editor of the Proceedings of the Royal Society B (1998–2004). Alexander specialised in research on animal mechanics and published numerous books and research papers in the field from 1959.

Film and TV work
 Horizon (1976) TV series documentary
 The Hot-Blooded Dinosaurs (1976)  
 The Dinosaurs! (1992)
 Walking with Beasts (2001) TV series documentary (principal scientific advisor) 
 The Future Is Wild (2003) TV series documentary
 Extinct: A Horizon Guide to Dinosaurs (2001) TV documentary

Honours and awards
Alexander received several awards and honours during his career including:

1979 Linnean Medal for Zoology Linnean Society of London
1987 Elected a Fellow of the Royal Society (FRS)
2000 Birthday Honours List Commander of the Most Excellent Order of the British Empire (CBE)
2001 Foreign Honorary Member American Academy of Arts and Sciences
2002 Honorary Fellow Zoological Society of London
2003 Borelli Award American Society of Biomechanics

Personal life
Alexander married Ann Elizabeth Coulton in 1961.  They had a son and a daughter.

Death
Alexander died in 2016, aged 81.  He was survived by his wife and children.

Selected publications

Books

 Functional Design in Fishes, Hutchinson University Library, 1967, 1970
 Animal Mechanics, Sidgwick & Jackson, 1968
 Size and Shape, Edward Arnold, 1971
 The Chordates, Cambridge University Press, 1975 
 Mechanics and energetics of animal locomotion, with G. Goldspink, Halsted Press, 1977
 The Invertebrates, Cambridge University Press, 1979
 Optima for Animals, Hodder Arnold, 1982
 Locomotion of animals, Springer, 1985
 The Collins Encyclopedia of Animal Biology, HarperCollins Publishers, 1986
 Elastic Mechanisms in Animal Movement, Cambridge University Press, 1988
 Dynamics of Dinosaurs and other Extinct Giants, Columbia University Press, 1989
 Animals, Cambridge University Press, 1990
 How dinosaurs ran, Scientific American, 1991
 Animals, Cambridge University Press, 1991
 The Human Machine, Natural History Museum, Stationery Office Books, 1992
 Exploring Biomechanics: Animals in Motion, W H Freeman & Co, 1992
 Bones: The Unity of Form and Function, Macmillan General Reference, 1994
 Energy for Animal Life, Oxford University Press, 1999
 Exploring biomechanics: animals in motion, Scientific American Library, 1992
 Hydraulic mechanisms in locomotion, in Body Cavities: Function and Phylogeny, pp. 187–198, Selected Symposia and Monographs, 8, Mucchi.
 Principles of Animal Locomotion, Princeton University Press, 2003
 Human Bones: A Scientific and Pictorial Investigation, with Aaron Diskin, Pi Press, 2004
 Knochen! Was uns aufrecht hält - das Buch zum menschlichen Skelett, Spektrum Akademischer Verlag, 2006

Papers
(This is a small sample from over 250 papers)

 The Densities of Cyprinidae, 1959
 Visco-elastic properties of the body-wall of sea anemones, 1962
 Adaptation in the skulls and cranial muscles of South American characinoid fish, 1964
 Estimates of speeds of dinosaurs, 1976
 Bending of cylindrical animals with helical fibres in their skin or cuticle, 1987
 Tyrannosaurus on the run, 1996
 Dinosaur biomechanics, 2006
 Biomechanics: Stable Running, 2007
 Orangutans use compliant branches to lower the energetic cost of locomotion, 2007
 Incidence of healed fracture in the skeletons of birds, molluscs and primates, 2009
 Biomechanics: Leaping lizards and dinosaurs, 2012

References

1934 births
2016 deaths
20th-century British zoologists
People from Lisburn
People educated at Tonbridge School
Alumni of Trinity Hall, Cambridge
Academics of Bangor University
Academics of the University of Leeds
Fellows of the Royal Society
Commanders of the Order of the British Empire
Secretaries of the Zoological Society of London
Linnean Medallists